George Hay, Earl of Gifford (26 April 1822 – 22 December 1862) was a British Liberal Party politician.

Lord Gifford was born at Yester House, the eldest son of the 8th Marquess of Tweeddale.  He was educated at Trinity College and Trinity Hall, Cambridge, where he was president of the University Pitt Club. In 1850, he was a Captain in the East Lothian Yeomanry Cavalry and became Private Secretary to the Secretary of State for War (The Duke of Newcastle) in 1854. A year later, he entered Parliament as MP for Totnes (a seat he held until his death).

In 1862, Lord Gifford was involved in an accident whilst rescuing a workman about to be crushed by a tree the latter was cutting down in the grounds of Yester Castle. Because of the accident, the Dowager Baroness Dufferin and Claneboye (a close friend of his who previously refused his proposals) agreed to marry Lord Gifford and they did so at Dufferin Lodge on 13 October 1862. As a result of the accident, Lord Gifford died two months later and as he and his wife did not have any children, his brother, Lord Arthur became the heir to their father's titles and estate.

Sources

Burke's Peerage & Gentry
Electric Scotland - The Hays of Tweeddale
Worldroots

External links 
 

1822 births
1862 deaths
Alumni of Trinity College, Cambridge
Alumni of Trinity Hall, Cambridge
Courtesy earls
Heirs apparent who never acceded
Liberal Party (UK) MPs for English constituencies
UK MPs 1852–1857
UK MPs 1857–1859
UK MPs 1859–1865
Lothians and Border Horse officers
Members of the Parliament of the United Kingdom for Totnes